2005 Dakar Rally also known as the 2005 Paris-Dakar Rally was the 27th running of the Dakar Rally event. The course was shorter than in 2004 but was more challenging. A record number of competitors, 696 cars, motorbikes and trucks (including assistance vehicles) in total, entered the rally.

This year introduced a regulation for motorcycles that allowed open class single cylinder motorcycles of any capacity but limited twin cylinder motorcycles to 450cc.

Robby Gordon and Colin McRae swapped the lead in the early stages of the rally, until McRae suffered a crash during the sixth stage between Smara and Zouerat and retired from the event. Stephane Peterhansel took the lead after winning the seventh stage. The eighth stage between Tichit and Tidjikja across the Mauritanian desert was cancelled due to stormy weather. Luc Alphand won the ninth stage although Peterhansel retained the overall lead. Peterhansel won the tenth stage around the town of Atar in Mauritania, and retained his lead after the twelfth stage. The motorcycle stage was cancelled as a mark of respect for Fabrizio Meoni, twice winner of the motorcycle category, who died following an accident on the 11th stage. Peterhansel also won the thirteenth stage from Bamako to Kayes in Mali. The 14th stage was won by Ari Vatanen, the 51st of his career, the 15th was won by Giniel de Villiers, and the final stage by Bruno Saby.  The overall title was won by Stephane Peterhansel for the second successive year. The motorcycle category was won by Cyril Despres.

Entries

Bikes

Note: Number one was not issued as a mark of respect Richard Sainct, who was killed during the Rally of the Pharaohs in Egypt in September 2004. The reigning champion in the category, Nani Roma, switched to the car category for this year.

Cars

Trucks

Stages
 

Notes:
 — Stage cancelled for bikes only due to adverse weather conditions.
 — Stage cancelled for all classes due to poor visibility.
 — Stage cancelled for bikes only as tribute for Fabrizio Meoni, who died during the previous stage.
 — Stage winner Ari Vatanen penalised for excess speed.

Stage results

Motorcycles

Notes:
 — Despres' time includes a nine-minute penalty.

Cars

Notes:
 — Vatanen's time includes a 12-minute penalty for excess speed during the liaison section of the stage.

Trucks

Final standings

Motorcycles

Cars

Trucks

References

Dakar Rally
D
Dakar Rally, 2005
2005 in French motorsport